Chris Prothro is an American baseball coach and former catcher, who is the current head baseball coach of the Eastern Kentucky Colonels. He played college baseball at Northwestern State, Crowder College and Arkansas State for coach Keith Kessinger from 2004 to 2005.

Coaching career
After his playing career ended, Prothro became an assistant baseball coach at North Iowa Area Community College, where he worked with hitters, catchers and outfielders.

Following two seasons at North Iowa, he joined the coaching staff of the Nicholls State Colonels where he was on the staff of his former head coach at Crowder, Chip Durham.

In July, 2015, Prothro was hired as the recruiting coordinator at South Alabama.

On September 30, 2020, Prothro was named the 8th head coach in the history of Eastern Kentucky.

Head coaching record

References

Northwestern State Demons baseball players
Crowder Roughriders baseball players
Arkansas State Red Wolves baseball players
NIACC Trojans baseball coaches
Nicholls Colonels baseball coaches
1982 births
Eastern Kentucky Colonels baseball coaches
Living people